Wyoming Highway 131 (WYO 131) is a  north–south Wyoming State Road in Fremont County that travels from U.S. Route 287 (US 287) in Lander, south to Sinks Canyon State Park.

Route description
Wyoming Highway 131 begins its southern end at the northern boundary of the Shoshone National Forest at Sinks Canyon State Park, hence its name Sinks Canyon Road. WYO 131 travels northeast to Lander, entering from the southwest. Upon entering, WYO 131 turns east and becomes Fremont Street before turning north onto South 5th Street. According to the WYDOT 1997 route log, The last 1.68 miles of Highway 131 are maintained by the City of Lander rather than WYDOT. WYO 131 meets its north end when it reaches U.S. Route 287 (Main Street) in Lander. This road was first paved about 1959.

Major intersections

References

External links 

Wyoming State Routes 100-199
WYo 131 - US 287 to Sinks Canyon State Park
Sinks Canyon State Park
Lander, WY website

Transportation in Fremont County, Wyoming
131